Peter Seiichi Shirayanagi (白柳 誠一 Shirayanagi Seiichi, June 17, 1928 – December 30, 2009) was a Japanese Cardinal Priest of the Catholic Church and archbishop of Tokyo.

Life 

Born in Hachiōji, Tokyo, Japan, Shirayanagi studied at Sophia University, earning a degree in philosophy in 1951 and a specialization in theology in 1954. Ordained a priest on 21 December 1954 at Kanda Catholic Cathedral, he went to study at the Pontifical Urban University in Rome, earning a doctorate in Canon law in 1960.

Consecrated titular Bishop of Atenia and Auxiliary of Tokyo in 1966, he was named titular Archbishop of Castro and Coadjutor Archbishop of the Tokyo Archdiocese in 1969, and succeeded to the post of Archbishop of Tokyo in 1970. As archbishop, he continued the Tokyo Archdiocesan Convention, implementing the decrees of the Second Vatican Council, and in 1989 led a group to visit the Catholic Church in China. From 1983 to 1992, he presided over the Japanese Catholic Bishops' conference, which opened the Japanese Catholic Center in Tokyo in 1990.

In 1994, Pope John Paul II created him a Cardinal with the title of Cardinal-Priest of Santa Emerenziana a Tor Fiorenza. On 12 June 2000, he retired as archbishop of Tokyo. He was one of the cardinal electors who participated in the 2005 papal conclave that selected Pope Benedict XVI.

Cardinal Shirayanagi was hospitalized at the beginning of August, 2009 for cardiac arrhythmia, then suffered a light cerebral hemorrhage. On December 23 he moved to Loyola House, a Jesuit home for aged priests in Tokyo, where he died on December 30.

Shirayanagi was an honorary member of AV Edo-Rhenania zu Tokio, a Catholic student fraternity that is affiliated with Cartellverband.

This is the list of his major life events:
 On 17 June 1928, he was born in Hachioji (Tokyo). Baptized the following day by Fr.Meirand (MEP)
 On 21 December 1954, he was ordained a priest of Tokyo, Japan
 In June 1960, he graduated from Pontifical Urbaniana University (Doctor in Canon Law)
 On 15 March 1966, he was appointed an auxiliary bishop of Tokyo, Japan
 On 8 May 1966, he was consecrated titular Bishop of Atenia
 On 21 February 1970, he succeeded as Archbishop of Tokyo
 On 26 November 1994, he was elevated to a Cardinal
 On 17 February 2000, he resigned as the Archbishop of Tokyo
 On 18 April 2005, he participated in the Conclave that elected Pope Benedict XVI
 On 24 November 2008, he presided over the Mass of Beatification of Fr. Kibe and 187 martyrs (Nagasaki)
 On 30 December 2009, he died at Loyola House (Tokyo)

Notes

External links 
 Biography at catholic-pages.com

1928 births
2009 deaths
Cardinals created by Pope John Paul II
Japanese cardinals
People from Hachiōji, Tokyo
Sophia University alumni
20th-century Roman Catholic archbishops in the United States
20th-century cardinals
21st-century cardinals